Elrose was a provincial electoral district  for the Legislative Assembly of the province of Saskatchewan, Canada. Located in southwestern Saskatchewan, this constituency was centred on the town of Elrose. The riding was created before the 3rd Saskatchewan general election in 1912 as "Eagle Creek"; it was renamed "Elrose" in 1917.

The district was dissolved and combined with the Rosetown riding (as Rosetown-Elrose) before the 18th Saskatchewan general election in 1975. It is now part of a revived Rosetown-Elrose constituency.

Members of the Legislative Assembly

Election results

|-

|Conservative
|J.C. Laycock
|align="right"|619
|align="right"|43.38%
|align="right"|–
|- bgcolor="white"
!align="left" colspan=3|Total
!align="right"|1,427
!align="right"|100.00%
!align="right"|

|-

|Conservative
|Francis Henderson Forgie
|align="right"|963
|align="right"|31.18%
|align="right"|-12.20

|Independent
|Edward Richard Powell
|align="right"|867
|align="right"|28.08%
|align="right"|–
|- bgcolor="white"
!align="left" colspan=3|Total
!align="right"|3,088
!align="right"|100.00%
!align="right"|

|-

|Independent
|Homer Anthony Metcalf
|align="right"|1,701
|align="right"|45.63%
|align="right"|-

|Independent
|Adolph M. Wick
|align="right"|70
|align="right"|1.88%
|align="right"|-
|- bgcolor="white"
!align="left" colspan=3|Total
!align="right"|3,728
!align="right"|100.00%
!align="right"|

|-

|- bgcolor="white"
!align="left" colspan=3|Total
!align="right"|3,266
!align="right"|100.00%
!align="right"|

|-

|style="width: 130px"|Conservative
|James Cobban
|align="right"|3,136
|align="right"|60.06%
|align="right"|-

|- bgcolor="white"
!align="left" colspan=3|Total
!align="right"|5,221
!align="right"|100.00%
!align="right"|

|-

|Farmer-Labour
|Halvor Vindeg
|align="right"|1,807
|align="right"|33.40%
|align="right"|-

|Conservative
|Donald Byron Grant
|align="right"|1,390
|align="right"|25.69%
|align="right"|-34.37
|- bgcolor="white"
!align="left" colspan=3|Total
!align="right"|5,410
!align="right"|100.00%
!align="right"|

|-

|style="width: 130px"|CCF
|Louis Henry Hantelman
|align="right"|3,164
|align="right"|43.86%
|align="right"|+10.46

|Conservative
|Henry T. Blackwell
|align="right"|360
|align="right"|4.99%
|align="right"|-20.70
|- bgcolor="white"
!align="left" colspan=3|Total
!align="right"|7,214
!align="right"|100.00%
!align="right"|

|-

|style="width: 130px"|CCF
|Maurice Willis
|align="right"|3,771
|align="right"|57.21%
|align="right"|+13.35

|Prog. Conservative
|Ernest J. Ewing
|align="right"|1,013
|align="right"|15.37%
|align="right"|+10.38
|- bgcolor="white"
!align="left" colspan=3|Total
!align="right"|6,591
!align="right"|100.00%
!align="right"|

|-

|style="width: 130px"|CCF
|Maurice Willis
|align="right"|4,153
|align="right"|55.73%
|align="right"|-1.54

|- bgcolor="white"
!align="left" colspan=3|Total
!align="right"|7,452
!align="right"|100.00%

|-

|style="width: 130px"|CCF
|Maurice Willis
|align="right"|4,148
|align="right"|63.58%
|align="right"|+7.85

|- bgcolor="white"
!align="left" colspan=3|Total
!align="right"|6,524
!align="right"|100.00%
!align="right"|

|-

|style="width: 130px"|CCF
|Maurice Willis
|align="right"|3,840
|align="right"|55.50%
|align="right"|-8.08

|- bgcolor="white"
!align="left" colspan=3|Total
!align="right"|6,919
!align="right"|100.00%
!align="right"|

|-

|style="width: 130px"|CCF
|Olaf Turnbull
|align="right"|3,386
|align="right"|46.28%
|align="right"|-9.22

|Prog. Conservative
|Thomas Myers
|align="right"|1,722
|align="right"|23.54%
|align="right"|-

|- bgcolor="white"
!align="left" colspan=3|Total
!align="right"|7,316
!align="right"|100.00%
!align="right"|

|-

|CCF
|Olaf Turnbull
|align="right"|3,263
|align="right"|49.59%
|align="right"|+3.31
|- bgcolor="white"
!align="left" colspan=3|Total
!align="right"|6,580
!align="right"|100.00%
!align="right"|

|-

|NDP
|David Loewen
|align="right"|2,957
|align="right"|48.97%
|align="right"|-0.62
|- bgcolor="white"
!align="left" colspan=3|Total
!align="right"|6,038
!align="right"|100.00%
!align="right"|

|-

|style="width: 130px"|NDP
|Hayden Owens
|align="right"|3,147
|align="right"|52.16%
|align="right"|+3.19

|- bgcolor="white"
!align="left" colspan=3|Total
!align="right"|6,033
!align="right"|100.00%
!align="right"|

See also
Electoral district (Canada)
List of Saskatchewan provincial electoral districts
List of Saskatchewan general elections
List of political parties in Saskatchewan
Elrose, Saskatchewan

References
 Saskatchewan Archives Board – Saskatchewan Election Results By Electoral Division

Former provincial electoral districts of Saskatchewan